Increasingly is the first EP by the band 12012, released on April 28, 2004.

Track listing 
 "Gallows" - 3:14
 "Incident" - 3:58
 "Humanities" - 00:40
 "Chouchou -Tefutefu-" (蝶々～てふてふ～) - 4:39
 "Itsumo Kokoro ni Juujika wo" (いつも心に十字架を) - 5:08

Notes
Increasingly would later be remastered and be released as "Increasingly -Kanzen Ban-".
Only 3000 copies of the album were pressed.
The name was incorrectly printed as "Increasingry" on the album.

12012 albums
2004 EPs